The Fly class were built for the Royal Navy as a class of 16-gun brig-sloops; two 6-pounder guns on trucked gun-carriages towards the bows, and eight pairs of slide-mounted 24-pounder [[carronas along the broadsides. An extra two carronades were added soon after completion, so giving them 18 guns in practice (but the seven vessels remained officially classed as 16 guns). The class was designed by one of the Surveyors of the Navy - Sir John Henslow - and approved in 1805. The Admiralty ordered five vessels to this design in January 1805, 23 days after it had ordered the same quantity of the similar Seagull Class to a comparative design by William Rule, the other Surveyor of the Navy; it ordered two more Fly Class in August 1805, although this final pair were planked with hulls of pitch pine ("fir") rather than the normal oak used in the first five.

Vessels
In the following table, the Fly class brig-sloops are listed in the order in which they were instructed to be built (i.e. order dates).

Notes

References

British Warships in the Age of Sail, Rif Winfield, Seaforth Publishing, 2007. 

Sloops of the Royal Navy
Sloop classes